Erica Scourti (born in Athens) is an artist based in the UK whose works (which combine performance, digital media, the web, and video) have been exhibited at the Brighton Photo Biennial, the Hayward Gallery Project Space, and the Photographers' Gallery in London Her performance project, Life In Adwords (2012), involved her keeping a diary by email to her Google account and creating videos based on the advertising targeted to her as a result.

References

External links 
Official homepage
Don't Steal This Artist's Identity (Even Though She's Made It Easy) by Cal Revely-Calder, Garage Magazine 2018

Year of birth missing (living people)
Living people
21st-century Greek women artists
Artists from Athens
New media artists
Greek women film directors
Greek performance artists